Maximum Pool is a video game developed by Dynamix and published by Sierra On-Line under their Sierra Sports label for Windows and Dreamcast in 2000. It is the tenth game in the 3D Ultra series, and the successor to the 1999 game Cool Pool.

Reception

The game received "mixed or average reviews" on both platforms according to the review aggregation website Metacritic. GameZone gave the PC version a favorable review, nearly two months before it was released.

References

External links
 

2000 video games
Cue sports video games
Dreamcast games
Sierra Entertainment games
Windows games
Dynamix games
Multiplayer and single-player video games
Video games developed in the United States